"Stronger Than Ever" is a song by British R&B singer and actor Raleigh Ritchie, released as the lead single from his debut album, You're a Man Now, Boy. The song is also included on his EP Black and Blue (2014). The MJ Cole remix was released as a single in the United Kingdom as a digital download on 14 March 2014 through Columbia Records. The song peaked at number 30 on the UK Singles Chart. British singer-songwriter Lily Allen covered the song in an acoustic version at the BBC Radio 1's Live Lounge.

Music video
On 14 January 2014, a music video for the song directed by Ninian Doff was uploaded to VEVO and YouTube. The video shows Ritchie sitting on a park bench drinking coffee when a strong wind starts blowing which only affects him. The wind slowly gets stronger until it blows him off the bench. As of December 2020, the video has over 11.6 million views.

Track listing

Chart performance

Release history

Certifications

References

2014 singles
2014 songs
Raleigh Ritchie songs
Columbia Records singles
Songs written by Chris Loco
Music videos directed by Ninian Doff